Kangerluk (old spelling: Kangerdluk), also called Diskofjord, is a settlement in Qeqertalik municipality, in western Greenland, located on the southwestern shore of Disko Island. It had 11 inhabitants in 2020.

Population 
Kangerluk is rapidly depopulating, having lost two thirds of it's population since 2010.

References 

Disko Island
Populated places in Greenland
Populated places of Arctic Greenland
Qeqertalik